Scarlet Rebels are a five-piece Welsh melodic rock band residing in Llanelli, South Wales. On February 4, 2022, they achieved their first Official UK Top 40 Album with their album See Through Blue, released on Earache Records, debuting at #7. This made them the first band from Llanelli to ever achieve a UK Top 40 Album.

Scarlet Rebels are also known for their efforts to raise money and collect donations for local food banks and charities such as The Trussell Trust in response to the key social and political issues of the time.

History 
The band are currently signed to Earache Records and were formed in 2018. The band consist of Wayne Doyle (vocals/guitar), Chris Jones (lead guitar), Josh Townshend (guitar – and son of The Who's guitarist Simon Townshend and nephew of The Who's guitarist Pete Townshend), Wayne 'Pricey' Esmonde (bass) and Gary Doyle (drums).

Scarlet Rebels released their debut album Show Your Colours on August 8, 2019, with Rock of Angels Records, which was produced and engineered by Tim Hamill (known for his work with Lemmy, Girlschool and George Michael) and recorded at Sonic One Studios in Llanelli, South Wales. The album artwork was designed by guitarist Josh Townshend (who also played keyboard and piano on the album).

During the COVID-19 pandemic's restrictions on touring, the band recorded LIVE: Made in Sonic One, a live EP also recorded at Sonic One Studios. Show Your Colours and LIVE: Made In Sonic One were both hailed as Album Of The Month by Great Music Stories.

Their second studio album See Through Blue was written and recorded in 2020 (and once again was recorded with Tim Hamill). Throughout the album campaign, they saw airplay on Planet Rock (radio station)'s playlist and BBC Radio 2, and their track “Take You Home” was voted Classic Rock (magazine)'s Track of the Week.

Scarlet Rebels are considered a part of the New Wave Of Classic Rock scene (they appeared on The Official New Wave Of Classic Rock – Volume 1 compilation, which aimed to capture the most prominent bands in the fast-growing music scene). They have featured on the bill of live festivals such as Steelhouse Festival, Planet Rockstock, Planet Rock's Winter's End, Hard Rock Hell, WDR Fernsehen's Rockpalast Crossroads Festival, Loverocks and radio festival Spirit Of Wildfire.

Scarlet Rebels were awarded Band Of The Year by Meridian FM's Great Music Stories in 2019 (having been awarded several Band of the Month and Album of the Month accolades already) and were also a runner up to this title in 2020. Their track “These Days” was awarded Great Music Stories' Single of the Year in 2021. Their 2020 UK tour in support of their debut album Show Your Colours, The Rising Tour, was sponsored by Planet Rock Radio.

Food Bank Initiative 
From 2021, Scarlet Rebels began using their live shows for positive change, pledging to collect food donations at all headline shows going forward (via attendees or via delivery apps such as Deliveroo). They also participated in a sponsored cycle, raising over £2,000 for The Trussell Trust. An album launch event on the Thames that aimed to collect food donations for local food banks was cancelled due to the band's political album cover for See Through Blue, which featured an effigy of Prime Minister Boris Johnson as a demon.

Band members

Current members 

 Wayne Doyle – vocals, rhythm guitar (2018–present)
 Chris "CJ" Jones – lead guitar (2018–present)
 Josh Townshend - rhythm guitar, keyboard, piano (2018–present)
 Gary Doyle – drums (2018–present)
 Wayne "Pricey" Esmonde – bass guitar (2018–present)

Discography

Studio albums 

 Show Your Colours (2019)
 See Through Blue (2022)

Live albums 

 LIVE: Made In Sonic One (2020)

References 

Earache Records artists